Lake Erçek is an endorheic salt lake in Van Province in eastern Turkey, about  east of Lake Van. The northern and western shores are steep and rocky, whereas the southern and eastern shores slope gently with mudflats and coastal plains.

Geology and geography
Early research described Lake Erçek as having been formed through volcanic activity; however, recent research indicates that it is a tectonic lake. The lake's basin was formed by north–south trending faults during the Upper Pleistocene. It appears that the lake did not rise much above its current level during the Upper Pleistocene and Holocene, based on examination and radiocarbon dating of core samples of lake sediments. Research suggests the lake did not overflow its basin during this period.

The lake's main inflow is from the Memedik Çayı (also known as the Büyükçaylak Deresi), which enters via a broad fan at the west of the lake. The Karasu river, which rises along the Iranian border, passes within  of the northwest shore of the lake and is separated only by a low ridge, but it does not enter the lake and continues west to enter Lake Van northwest of the city of Van.

Natural history

Birds
Lake Ercek is an important site for breeding and migrating waterbirds. Between 18 and 39 endangered white-headed ducks were recorded at the lake in 2000, including two or three breeding pairs. Other birds recorded as breeding at the lake include the Kentish plover (75–85 pairs) and the greater sandplover (10–15 pairs). The lake is also used in passing by the ruddy shelduck, common shelduck, black-necked grebe, pied avocet and gull-billed tern. In 2020 it was reported that 177 different types of birds have been seen at the lake, 71 of them live there the whole year.

References

Sources

Bibliography 

 
 
 
 

Ercek
Landforms of Van Province
Important Bird Areas of Turkey